Parasphendale agrionina species of praying mantis in the family Miomantidae. It has been given the common name budwing mantis for its vestigial wings (present in adult females).  Females are incapable of flight.

Description
Females can grow to 2.75 inches (7 cm) long and males to 1.25 inches (3 cm) long.

Distribution
The budwing mantis is found primarily in East Africa, specifically in Kenya, Somalia, and Ethiopia.

See also
List of mantis genera and species

References

Mantidae
Mantodea of Africa
Insects described in 1869